Joseph Pierre Rondou (6 June 1860, Gèdre – 1935) was a French entomologist who specialised in Lepidoptera.

Works
partial list
Rondou, J.P., Catalogue des Lepidoptères des Pyrenées. Ann. Soc. ent. France 1932–1935. Concerns especially the Hautes-Pyrenees. Also bound as a book.

References
Charles Oberthur Portraits de Lepidopteristes. Premiere Series. in Etudes de Lepidopterologie Comparee fascicule X. 1915
Gaedecke, R. and Groll, E. K. (Hrsg.): Biografien der Entomologen der Welt : Datenbank. Version 4.15 : Senckenberg Deutsches Entomologisches Institut, 2010 

French lepidopterists
1935 deaths
1860 births
People from Hautes-Pyrénées
20th-century French zoologists